Ioannis Athanasoulas (alternate spellings: Giannis, Yiannis, Yannis, Athanassoulas) (born January 21, 1987) is a Greek professional basketball player for Psychiko of the Greek A2 Basket League. He is a 2.02 m (6' 7") tall small forward–power forward.

Professional career
Athanasoulas began his pro career with the Greek 1st Division club AEK Athens in 2005. In 2007, he moved to the Greek club Ilysiakos, which was playing in the Greek 2nd Division at the time. In 2010, he joined the Greek club Panionios and 4 seasons later moved to Panelefsiniakos. In 2015, he moved to Apollon Patras. In 2016, he moved to Lavrio. In 2017, he moved to Iraklis Thessaloniki.

National team career
Athanasoulas was a member of the Greek junior national teams. With the junior national teams of Greece, he played at the 2003 FIBA Europe Under-16 Championship, and the 2007 FIBA Europe Under-20 Championship.

References

External links
Euroleague.net Profile
FIBA Profile
FIBA Europe Profile
Eurobasket.com Profile
Greek Basket League Profile 
Draftexpress.com Profile
AEK Profile

1987 births
Living people
AEK B.C. players
Greek men's basketball players
Ilysiakos B.C. players
Iraklis Thessaloniki B.C. players
Lavrio B.C. players
Panionios B.C. players
Panelefsiniakos B.C. players
Psychiko B.C. players
Power forwards (basketball)
Small forwards
Basketball players from Athens